"Megamix" is a song by German dance band R.I.O. The song was released in Germany as a digital download in August 2013. The song has charted in Austria and Germany, peaking to number 19. The song was written by Toni Cottura, Stephan Browarczyk, Shahin Moshirian, Yann Peifer, Christoph Brüx, Vick Krishna, Craig Smart, Manuel Reuter, Andres Ballinas, Michael Bein and R. Bibow.

Music video
A music video to accompany the release of "Megamix" was first released onto YouTube on 2 August 2013 at a total length of eight minutes and twenty-two seconds.

Track listing

Chart performance

Weekly charts

Release history

References

2013 singles
R.I.O. songs
2013 songs
Kontor Records singles
Songs written by DJ Manian
Songs written by Yanou
Songs written by Andres Ballinas
Songs written by Toni Cottura
Songs written by Christoph Brüx